Canarana brachialis is a species of beetle in the family Cerambycidae. It was described by Félix Édouard Guérin-Méneville in 1855. It is known from Bolivia, Brazil, Peru and Ecuador.

References

brachialis
Beetles described in 1855